Rami Alanko (born 31 December 1975) is a Finnish former professional ice hockey player.

He is former hockey player for the Espoo Blues in the Finnish SM-liiga. He joined the club in May 2007. He started his career in 1995 and has played with several Finnish clubs including HPK, Espoo Blues, Jokerit and Haukat. With Jokerit Alanko won Finnish championship and Continental Cup. He has also played a short stint in Switzerland for Kloten Flyers in 1997. He played with Swedish club Färjestad BK between 2005 and November 2006, during that time he won the Swedish Championship with them in April 2006. When he left Färjestad he signed with German club Frankfurt Lions and played with them until the end of the 2006/07 season. He then moved back home to Finland and signed for Espoo Blues. In August 2008, the Dutch continued to contract until spring 2011. He represented the Blues during the period 2008-2009 in the Champions League. Netherlands during the period was twice kuitekin bad concussion. He was awarded for the third year in a concussion for the period 2009-2010, however, in the second match against carp Oulu, when Mikko Alikoski tackled Alanko rules against the side. The match was the last of Alanko's career.

External links 
 Stat's at EliteProspects.com
 

1975 births
Espoo Blues players
Finnish ice hockey defencemen
Frankfurt Lions players
Färjestad BK players
HPK players
Jokerit players
Living people
Ice hockey people from Helsinki
20th-century Finnish people
21st-century Finnish people